Harry Watson (13 June 1871 – 17 September 1936) was an English landscape and portrait artist born in Scarborough. He briefly lived in Canada between 1881 and 1883.

Biography
Watson studied at the Scarborough School of Art 1884–88, at Lambeth School of Art and at the Royal College of Art (R.C.A.) 1889–94, where he won numerous gold, silver and bronze medals and was awarded a traveling scholarship to Italy.

Watson exhibited at the Royal Academy (R.A.) from 1896; member R.W.S. 1915; R.W.A. 1927; R.O.I. 1932. Taught at Regent Street Polytechnic from 1913.

Watson embraced En plein air painting, often capturing the effect of natural light falling to on to his subjects which gives many of his works an impressionistic style. His paintings Sunlight Reflected Upon a Wide Riverscape and Reflected Light are two examples which demonstrate his use of natural light.

His watercolour Across the River is in the permanent collection at the Tate Gallery.  The Christchurch art gallery, Wellington art gallery and Brighton & Hove Museum & Art Gallery also have examples of his work. His work was part of the painting event in the art competition at the 1932 Summer Olympics.

In 1938 a memorial exhibition was held at Leamington Spa Art Gallery.

Harry Watson was a lifelong friend of Fred Appleyard.

References

External links

 Harry Watson Biography 

1871 births
1936 deaths
19th-century English painters
English male painters
20th-century English painters
English landscape painters
People from Scarborough, North Yorkshire
Alumni of the Lambeth School of Art
Alumni of the Royal College of Art
Olympic competitors in art competitions
20th-century English male artists
19th-century English male artists